1974 college football season may refer to:

 1974 NCAA Division I football season
 1974 NCAA Division II football season
 1974 NCAA Division III football season
 1974 NAIA Division I football season
 1974 NAIA Division II football season